This is a list of films about women's issues.

Films about women's issues

Directors 

Some directors that cover this topic in their films:

 Icíar Bollaín

See also 

 Women's cinema
 Women's rights

Women's issues